Juru may refer to:

 Juru, Iran, a village in Iran
 Juru, Malaysia, settlement in Malaysia
 Juru, Paraíba, a municipality in Brazil
 Juru people, an ethnic group of Australia
 Juru language, an Australian language

See also 
 Cao Juru, Chinese politician
 Jooro, Queensland
 Juro (disambiguation)

Language and nationality disambiguation pages